The Federal Office of Transport (FOT, ; ;) is a division of the Swiss Federal Department of Environment, Transport, Energy and Communications. It is the supervisory authority for the fields of public and freight transport in Switzerland, covering rail transport, cableways, ships, trams and buses. The FOT is responsible for safety, finance and infrastructure, as well as the legal and political frameworks of all said transport modes.

The FOT is not responsible for civil aviation, which is the responsibility of the Federal Office of Civil Aviation, nor for roads, which are the responsibility of the Federal Roads Authority.

The FOT is located in Ittigen, near Switzerland's de facto capital city of Bern, and employs about 310 people. The director of the FOT is Peter Füglistaler.

References

External links 
 

Government of Switzerland
Transport
Federal Department of Environment, Transport, Energy and Communications